Gelukskroon transmitter is a large FM-/TV-transmission facility near Pretoria, South Africa. It consists of several towers among them a 112.8 metres (370 ft) tall partially guyed lattice tower standing on the roof of a building, which is the tallest tower of the facility, and a telecommunication tower built of concrete.

External links 
 https://web.archive.org/web/20110719004527/http://radio.ffgsk.de/pretoria_gelukskroon.php

Towers in South Africa